Blackduck Lake is a lake in Beltrami County, Minnesota, in the United States.

Blackduck Lake was named for the Ring-necked duck, Blackduck was named after this lake.

See also
List of lakes in Minnesota

References

Lakes of Minnesota
Lakes of Beltrami County, Minnesota